Heo Ga-yoon (born May 18, 1990), better known by the mononym Gayoon, is a South Korean actress and singer. She is a former member of South Korean girl group 4Minute and its sub-group 2Yoon.

Biography

Early life and education
Heo was born on May 18, 1990, in Goyang. She received second place at SM's 9th "Best Singer Contest" in 2005. She graduated from Dongduk Girl's High School. In 2008, Heo appeared in Mario's "I'm Yours" music video, with Seulong from 2AM.

In 2011, she enrolled into Dongguk University where she majored in film and theater. On September 17, 2014, Heo, along other stars, were appointed as ambassadors of Dongguk University. She graduated in 2016.

2009–2012: 4Minute and solo activities
Heo was chosen as a member of  4Minute in 2009. The five-member girl group official debuted on June 18, 2009, performing their debut single, "Hot Issue", on Mnet's M! Countdown.

On February 11, 2010, Heo was featured on the soundtrack for The Woman Who Still Wants to Marry, singing a duet with Han Ye-ji in the song "One Two Three". On September 3, 2010, Ga-yoon was a featured artist in Sunny Side'''s  album, "Bad Guy Good Girl" with the song "Bad Guy Good Girl". In October 2010, Heo Ga-yoon was one of twenty idols from different South Korean groups that recorded the song, "Let's Go", for the purpose of increasing public participation in the 2010 G-20 Seoul summit. She provided vocals along with labelmates Yong Jun-hyung and G.NA.

Heo recorded "Wind Blow" for the soundtrack of MBC's My Princess; the song was released on January 5, 2011. She also recorded "Shameless Lie" for the soundtrack of SBS' Lie to Me, which was composed by Jadu and E-Tribe. The song was released on May 17, 2011. Heo made her acting debut on I'm a Flower Too with a cameo appearance as a high school student. On October 24, 2011 she released her OST song "I Think It Was a Dream" for KBS's Poseidon. Ga-yoon was also featured on Mario's song "Message" and promoted alongside him for that song.

In 2012, Ga-yoon played Hyun Kyung in MBC's drama Light and Shadow. In May 2012, Ga-yoon made an appearance along with group mate Hyuna on Top Gear Korea. Ga-yoon released a solo single on November 16, 2012. The song is called "My Love By My Side" and is a duet with BtoB's Ilhoon. On the October 21 episode of the live music show Inkigayo, Ga-yoon performed a new song for the SBS Gayo Daejeon music spectacular. As part of Mystic White, Ga-yoon released the charity song "Mermaid Princess" on December 26, 2012. The group would go on to perform the song in a one off performance during the year end SBS Gayo Daejeon show.

2013–2016: Disbandment of 4Minute
In 2014, HyunA, Ga-yoon, and Sohyun released the song "Only Gained Weight" for Brave Brothers' tenth anniversary album in January. In September, Gayoon became an MC for the third season of OnStyle's fashion program Style Log, together with Beast's Lee Gi-kwang and Do Sang Woo. The season premiered on September 12.

In 2015, Gayoon released an OST for SBS's Yong-pal called "Nightmare" together with Yong Jun-hyung on August 18. In November, it was revealed that Gayoon will make her big screen debut with the movie Father, Daughter''. Gayoon, Jung So-min and Min Do-hee will be acting as daughters.

On June 13, 2016, Cube Entertainment announced that 4Minute decided to disband and the members were still in discussions on renewing their contracts. On June 15, 2016 Cube Entertainment officially announced that Jihyun, Gayoon, Jiyoon and Sohyun's contracts expired on June 14 and none of them had decided to renew with the company.

2016–present: Acting career
On October 14, it was announced that Gayoon would be joining BS Company as an actress.

Discography

Solo songs

Collaboration

Filmography

Film

Television series

Television show

References

External links 
 

1990 births
Living people
Singers from Seoul
Actresses from Seoul
Models from Seoul
Cube Entertainment artists
4Minute members
Dongguk University alumni
Japanese-language singers of South Korea
South Korean film actresses
South Korean television actresses
South Korean women pop singers
South Korean female models
South Korean female idols
South Korean rhythm and blues singers
21st-century South Korean singers
21st-century South Korean women singers